Neodiplectanum is a genus of monopisthocotylean monogeneans, belonging to the family Diplectanidae.
According to Mizelle & Blatz (1941), the genus Neodiplectanum "differs from Diplectanum Diesing, 1858, its closest relative, by the presence of two, instead of three, cuticular bars on the haptor". Oliver (1987) thought that the two genera were synonyms, but Neodiplectanum was resurrected later.

Species of Neodiplectanum are parasitic on the gills of fish of the family Gerreidae.

Species
According to the World Register of Marine Species, species in this genus include:
 Neodiplectanum gatunense (Mendoza Franco, Roche & Torchin, 2008) Domingues, Diamanka & Pariselle, 2011 
 Neodiplectanum magnodiscatum (Fuentes Zambrano, 1997) Domingues, Diamanka & Pariselle, 2011  
 Neodiplectanum mexicanum (Mendoza Franco, Roche & Torchin, 2008) Domingues, Diamanka & Pariselle, 2011 
 Neodiplectanum wenningeri Mizelle & Blatz, 1941  (type species)

References

Diplectanidae
Monogenea genera
Parasites of fish